Egyptian astrology may refer to:
 Ancient Egyptian astronomy
 Astrology in Hellenistic Egypt